Per-Owe "Trollet" Trollsås (18 January 1933 – 5 November 2000) was a Swedish sprinter who won a silver medal in the 400 m hurdles at the 1958 European Athletics Championships, setting a national record in the semifinal. He competed in the 400 m hurdles and 4 × 400 m relay at the 1960 Summer Olympics, but failed to reach the finals. 
 
Trollsås won national titles in the 100 m (1952–53), 400 m hurdles (1957–60) and 4 × 400 m relay (1958). After retiring from competitions he served as vice-chairman of the Stora Grabbars Association for many years.

References

1933 births
2000 deaths
Swedish male sprinters
Olympic athletes of Sweden
Athletes (track and field) at the 1960 Summer Olympics
European Athletics Championships medalists